The 2016 Rayo OKC season was the club's only season of existence, during which they played in North American Soccer League, the second tier of the American soccer pyramid.

Season Events
Former San Antonio Scorpions head coach Alen Marcina was named Rayo head coach on January 7, 2016. Marcina resigned as manager on August 1, being replaced by Gerard Nus.

Roster

Staff
  Alen Marcina – Head Coach
  Dario Pot – Assistant Coach

Transfers

Winter

In:

Out:

Summer

In:

Out:

Friendlies

Competitions

NASL Spring season

Standings

Results summary

Results by round

Matches

NASL Fall season

Standings

Results summary

Results by round

Matches

Combined Standings

The Championship

U.S. Open Cup 

Rayo OKC will compete in the 2016 edition of the Open Cup.

Squad statistics

Appearances and goals

|-
|colspan="14"|Players who left Rayo OKC during the season:

|}

Goal scorers

Disciplinary record

References

External links
 

Rayo OKC seasons
American soccer clubs 2016 season
2016 North American Soccer League season
2016 in sports in Oklahoma